Copper Hill is a census-designated place in Gila County, Arizona, United States.  Copper Hill  is located near US Route 60, northeast of the city of Globe.  The population as of the 2010 U.S. Census was 108.

Geography

Demographics

References

External links
 Copperhill – ghosttowns.com
 Copper Hill – Ghost Town of the Month at azghosttowns.com

Census-designated places in Gila County, Arizona
Ghost towns in Arizona